Von Campenhausen  (Camphusen, Camphus, Kamphaus, Camphuis, Kamphuis; Кампенгаузен) is a Baltic German and Swedish noble family descending from Spanish Netherlands. Members of the family occupied many important positions within Russian Empire, Sweden, Poland and Germany.

Notable members
Axel Freiherr von Campenhausen (born 1934), German canon lawyer
Balthasar Freiherr von Campenhausen (1689–1758), Russian lieutenant general, participant of the Great Northern War and General-Governor of Finland in 1741–1743.
Balthasar von Campenhausen (1745–1800), Russian statesman
Balthasar von Campenhausen (1772–1823), Baron, Balthasar Freiherr von Campenhausen and Saaremaa, Mayor of Taganrog, Russian statesman, Privy Councilor, chamberlain.
Hans von Campenhausen (1903–1989), German theologist
Johann Camphusen (?–1512), Mayor of Riga
Johann Christoph von Campenhausen (1716–1782),
Johannes Freiherr von Campenhausen (born 1935), German politician, former leader of German Party.
Johann Hermann von Campenhausen (1641–1705), Swedish militarian, engineer of Tallinn fortifications
Leyon Pierce Balthasar von Campenhausen (1746–1807), poet, playwright and publicist

See also
List of Swedish noble families

External links

 Genealogisches Handbuch der baltischen Ritterschaften, Teil 1, 1: Livland,  Görlitz 1929

Swedish noble families
Baltic-German people
People from Livonia
Baltic nobility
German noble families
Russian nobility
Livonian noble families
Polish noble families